Kohnak (also Romanized as Kohonak; also known as Kahnag, Kāhūnak, Kohang, and Kūhānak) is a village in Choghamish Rural District, Choghamish District, Dezful County, Khuzestan Province, Iran. At the 2006 census, its population was 1,520, in 279 families.

References 

Populated places in Dezful County